Albert Bell II (born April 23, 1964) was a wide receiver in the National Football League who played for the Green Bay Packers.  Bell played collegiate ball for the University of Alabama before playing professionally for one season in 1988.

References

1964 births
Living people
Players of American football from Los Angeles
American football wide receivers
Alabama Crimson Tide football players
Coffeyville Red Ravens football players
Green Bay Packers players
People from Crenshaw, Los Angeles
Players of American football from Birmingham, Alabama